Joshua Mark Kasevich (born January 17, 2001) is an American professional baseball shortstop in the Toronto Blue Jays organization. He is ranked 10th on Major League Baseball's 2022 Top 30 Blue Jays prospects list.

Amateur career
Kasevich attended Palo Alto High School in Palo Alto, California. After going 3–2 with a 2.10 ERA alongside batting .398 as a junior in 2018, he committed to play college baseball at the University of Oregon. He batted .407 with two home runs alongside going 5–1 with a 0.52 ERA as a senior in 2019. Unselected in the 2019 Major League Baseball draft, he enrolled at Oregon.

As a freshman at Oregon in 2020, Kasevich batted .135 over 37 at-bats before the season was cancelled due to the COVID-19 pandemic. As a redshirt freshman in 2021, he appeared in 55 games and slashed .324/.397/.444 with four home runs, fifty RBIs, and seven stolen bases. That summer, he played in the Northwoods League for the Waterloo Bucks. For the 2022 season, Kasevich played in 61 games and batted .310/.383/.445 with seven home runs, 44 RBIs, 16 strikeouts, and 24 walks. He was named First Team All Pac-12.

Professional career
Kasevich was selected by the Toronto Blue Jays in the second round with the 60th overall pick of the 2022 Major League Baseball draft. He signed with the team for $1 million. He made his professional debut with the Dunedin Blue Jays, batting .262 with seven RBIs and eight doubles over 25 games.

Personal life
Kasevich's father is a professor at Stanford University and his brother played college baseball there.

References

External links
Oregon Ducks bio

2001 births
Living people
Baseball players from California
Sportspeople from Palo Alto, California
Baseball shortstops
Oregon Ducks baseball players
Waterloo Bucks players
Dunedin Blue Jays players